The France women's national under-16 and under-17 basketball team is a national basketball team of France and is governed by the Fédération Française de Basket-Ball. 
It represents the country in international under-16 and under-17 (under age 16 and under age 17) women's basketball competitions.

World Cup results

See also
France women's national basketball team
France women's national under-19 basketball team
France men's national under-17 basketball team

References

External links

u
Women's national under-17 basketball teams